Lawler's algorithm is a powerful technique for solving a variety of constrained scheduling problems. particularly single-machine scheduling. The algorithm handles any precedence constraints. It schedules a set of simultaneously arriving tasks on one processor with precedence constraints to minimize maximum tardiness or lateness. Precedence constraints occur when certain jobs must be completed before other jobs can be started.

Objective functions
When , the objective function corresponds to minimizing the maximum lateness, where  is due time for job  and  lateness of job .

Algorithm
The algorithm builds the schedule back to front. For each scheduling step, it looks only at the tasks that no other tasks depend on, and puts the one with the latest due date at the end of the schedule queue. Then it repeats this process until all jobs are scheduled. 

The algorithm works by planning the job with the least impact as late as possible. Starting at  that   is the production time of job .

  set of already scheduled jobs (at start: S = )
  set of jobs whose successors have been scheduled (at start: all jobs without successors)
  time when the next job will be completed
 while do
     select  such that 
     schedule  such that it completes at time 
     
 end while

Example 1
Assuming there are three jobs: t1, t2, and t3, with the following precedence constraints:
 t1-> t2, t1 must finish before t2
 t1-> t3, t1 must finish before t3
And the following deadlines (due date in a month)
 t1: 2nd day
 t2: 5th day
 t3: 8th day

Now we construct the required set of jobs:
 S = {empty},  initially empty set of scheduled jobs
 J = {t2, t3}, the set of jobs whose successors have been scheduled or jobs without successors. t2 and t3 have no successors.
Repeat the following steps until J is empty:
 select a job j in J, so its due date is the latests, in this example, it is t3 with a due date 8th.
 move j from J to S's front, now J = {t2}, S={t3}.
 update J to add any new job whose successors have been scheduled. There is none this time. 
Do the next round: 
 select a job j in J, so its due date is the latests. It is t2 with due date 5th this time.
 move j from J to S's front, now J = {empty}, S={t2, t3}
 update J to add any new job whose successors have been scheduled, now J= {t1} since both t2 and t3 have been scheduled.
Do the next round: 
 select a job j in J={t1}, so its due date is the latests. This example, it is t1.
 move j from J to S's front, now J = {empty}, S={t1, t2, t3}
 update J to add any new job whose successors have been scheduled. Nothing to add. 
J is now empty. The end.

So the final schedule is t1 -> t2-> t3 as S = {t1, t2, t3}

Example 2
A more complex example, with simplified steps:
The jobs and precedence constraints are shown below: a parent node --> child node in the tree.
      j1 
     (2) 
    /   \
   j2    j3 
  (2)    (4)
  / \     |
 j4 j5   j6
(3) (5)  (6)  
The due dates of jobs are shown underneath of each node of the tree in parentheses. 
 j1: 2
 j2: 5
 j3: 4
 j4: 3
 j5: 5
 j6: 6
Now look at the set of jobs without any successors, find the one with latest due date, put it into the front of S: 
 The S set would be { j1, j2, j4, j3, j5, j6}

References

Further reading
 Michael Pinedo. Scheduling: theory, algorithms, and systems. 2008. 
 Conway, Maxwell, Miller. Theory of Scheduling. 1967. 

Production planning
Optimal scheduling